Gwiin-dong (귀인동, 貴仁洞) is a neighborhood of Dongan district in the city of Anyang, Gyeonggi Province, South Korea.

External links
 Gwiin-dong 

Dongan-gu
Neighbourhoods in Anyang, Gyeonggi